Wang Jeong may refer to:

Great King Munwon ( 10th century), son of Taejo of Goryeo
Gangjong of Goryeo (1152–1213), king of Goryeo
Wonjong of Goryeo (1219–1274), king of Goryeo
Chunghye of Goryeo (1315–1344), king of Goryeo